Osório Smith de Freitas Carvalho (born 24 July 1981) is a former footballer who played as a midfielder. Born in Portugal, he represented Angola at international level.

Career
Born in Carcavelos, Osório played in his native Portugal for Sporting B, Marco, Estrela Portalegre, Paredes, Pampilhosa, Odivelas, Sintrense and Juventude de Évora, before moving to Cyprus to spend a year-and-a-half with AEK Kouklia where he scored 7 goals.

He signed for Angolan side Caála in 2010, earning Angolan nationality and therefore becoming eligible for the Angolan national side; he made his international debut that same year.

References

External links

1981 births
Living people
Portuguese footballers
Portuguese sportspeople of Angolan descent
Angolan footballers
Angola international footballers
Association football midfielders
Angolan expatriate footballers
Portuguese expatriate footballers
Sporting CP B players
F.C. Marco players
U.S.C. Paredes players
FC Pampilhosa players
Odivelas F.C. players
S.U. Sintrense players
Juventude Sport Clube players
AEK Kouklia F.C. players
C.R. Caála players
Atlético Petróleos de Luanda players
S.L. Benfica (Luanda) players
Académica Petróleos do Lobito players
Girabola players
2011 African Nations Championship players
2012 Africa Cup of Nations players
Expatriate footballers in Cyprus
Angolan expatriate sportspeople in Cyprus
Portuguese expatriate sportspeople in Cyprus
Angola A' international footballers